Youssoupha Ndiaye may refer to:
Youssoupha Ndiaye (politician) (1938–2021), Senegalese politician
Youssoupha N'Diaye (footballer) (born 1997), Senegalese footballer

See also
Youssouf N'Diaye (born 1995), French footballer